Lena Khalaf Tuffaha is a poet, essayist, and translator. She is co-founder of the Institute for Middle East Understanding and the author of three works of poetry: Letters from the Interior (Diode Editions); the 2018 Washington State Book Award winner Water & Salt (Red Hen Press); and the 2016 Two Sylvias Press Prize winner Arab in Newsland (Two Sylvias Press). Khalaf Tuffaha is the recipient of a 2019 Washington State Artist Trust Fellowship and the inaugural Poet-In-Residence at Open Books: A Poem Emporium in Seattle, Washington. Her writing has appeared or is forthcoming in Barrow Street, Hayden's Ferry Review, Michigan Quarterly Review, New England Review, TriQuarterly, and the Academy of American Poets Poem-a-Day series. Khalaf Tuffaha holds a BA in Comparative Literature from the University of Washington and an MFA from the Rainier Writing Workshop at Pacific Lutheran University. Based in Washington, Khalaf Tuffaha has also served as spokesperson for the Seattle, WA chapter of the American-Arab Anti-Discrimination Committee.

Works
Letters from the Interior. Diode Editions. 2019. 
Water & Salt. Red Hen Press. 2017. 
Arab in Newsland. Two Sylvias Press. 2017.

References

External links

Living people
American women poets
American people of Palestinian descent
American people of Syrian descent
American people of Jordanian descent
Activists from Washington (state)
Poets from Washington (state)
21st-century American poets
Year of birth missing (living people)
21st-century American translators
21st-century American women writers
University of Washington alumni
Pacific Lutheran University alumni